Freiherr Horst Julius Treusch von Buttlar-Brandenfels (14 June 1888 – 3 September 1962) was a German general. Freiherr, which equals "Baron", was his title of nobility.

He was known for commanding several airships during World War I, including the most successful Zeppelin of the war, the Zeppelin L 30.

He was the commander of Frankfurt Airport at the end of World War II.

Medals
Buttlar-Brandenfels was awarded the Pour le Mérite on 9 April 1918 for his service as the commander of Zeppelin L-54.

Other distinctions awarded to him were:
 
 Iron Cross (1914), 1st and 2nd class
 Knights Cross of the House Order of Hohenzollern with Swords (9 October 1916)
 Hanseatic Cross of Hamburg

Works
 Im Marineluftschiff gegen England! Eckart. Berlin 1917.
 Luftschiffangriffe auf England. E.S. Mittler & Sohn. Berlin 1918.
 Zeppeline gegen England. von Hase & Koehler. Leipzig 1931.

See also
 Marinekabinett (in German) :de:Marinekabinett

References

1888 births
1962 deaths
Luftwaffe personnel of World War II
People from Hanau
Recipients of the Pour le Mérite (military class)
Imperial German Navy personnel of World War I
German airship aviators
Barons of Germany
People from Hesse-Nassau